Samuel Wilson (1766–1854) was an American meat packing baron alleged to be the original "Uncle Sam".

Samuel Wilson may also refer to:

Politics
Sir Samuel Wilson (Portsmouth MP) (1832–1895), Irish-Australian pastoralist and politician
Sir Samuel Herbert Wilson (1873–1950), British colonial governor
Samuel Davis Wilson (1881–1939), American mayor of Philadelphia
Samuel Franklin Wilson (1845–1923), American Confederate veteran, politician and judge
Sammy Wilson (politician) (born 1953), Northern Irish politician

Sports
Samuel Wilson (footballer) (born 1983),  Nicaraguan footballer
Sammy Wilson (footballer, born 1931) (1931–2014), Scottish footballer
Sammy Wilson (footballer, born 1937), Northern Irish footballer

Other
Samuel Alexander Kinnier Wilson (1878–1937), British neurologist who first described Wilson's disease in 1912*
Samuel J. Wilson (1828–1883), Presbyterian academic and pastor
Samuel Grayson Wilson (born 1949), U.S. federal judge
Samuel B. Wilson (1873–1954), American lawyer and judge from Minnesota
Samuel V. Wilson (1923–2017), United States Army, former Director DIA and intelligence guru
Samuel Wilson (East India Company officer), career Bombay Army officer, reaching rank of major general
Samuel Thomas "Sam" Wilson, a fictional Marvel Comics superhero known as the Falcon
 Sam Wilson (Marvel Cinematic Universe), film version of the character